Michel van Guldener (born 3 December 1985) is a Dutch professional footballer who plays for VV Nieuwerkerk in the Dutch Eerste Klasse.

Career
Born in Rotterdam, van Guldener began his career with home-town club Excelsior, making his debut in the 2004-2005 season.

The striker signed in 2010 for Topklasse team Capelle and played there three years, before moved in summer 2013 to Eerste klasse zondag team VV Nieuwerkerk.

Notes

1985 births
Living people
Dutch footballers
Excelsior Rotterdam players
Footballers from Rotterdam

Association football forwards